HPRCC may refer to:

 High Plains Regional Climate Center, one of the six Regional Climate Centers in the United States
 Hereditary papillary renal cell cancer, a familial renal cancer syndrome